TV Loves You Back is the fourth studio album by American hip hop group Restiform Bodies. It was released on Anticon in 2008.

Release
On July 22, 2008, "Bobby Trendy Addendum" became available digitally via Impose. On September 9, 2008, Tobacco's remix of "Panic Shopper" was posted by XLR8R. TV Loves You Back was released on September 30, 2008. A remix version of the album, TV Loves You Back Remixes, was released in 2013.

Critical reception
Amorn Bholsangngam of URB gave the album 3.5 stars out of 5, saying, "TV Loves You Back is the closest to pop that Anticon may ever come, a refreshing change of pace for listeners weary of the heavy, serious musical soliloquies that the label specializes in." Vish Khanna of Exclaim! called it "the perfectly imperfect soundtrack to an information overloaded yet, ironically, attention deficit addled culture." Ande Pareti of Soundcheck Magazine wrote: "Each song on TV Loves You Back is a carefully concocted trip, and listening to the album in its entirety is delightful substance abuse."

Chris Martins of The A.V. Club gave the album a grade of A−, saying, "Passage's verses are hailstorms of cyberized imagery and sarcastic poetry, while producers Bomarr and Telephone Jim Jesus skip art-hop subtlety for beats that bang." Mark Keresman of East Bay Express said: "Like Public Enemy at their best, Restiform Bodies engage you with the beats and audacious flair then make you look long and hard into funhouse-warped, revealing mirrors."

Track listing

References

External links
 

2008 albums
Anticon albums
Restiform Bodies (band) albums